Marcelus Jalon Kemp (born May 18, 1984) is an American professional basketball player who last played for Montepaschi Siena of the Italian League. Born in Seattle, Washington, he can play as a shooting guard or small forward.

References

External links
 Eurobasket.com Profile
 DraftExpress.com Profile
 Italian League Profile 
 TBLStat.net Profile

1984 births
Living people
African-American basketball players
American expatriate basketball people in Italy
American expatriate basketball people in Turkey
American expatriate basketball people in Venezuela
Beşiktaş men's basketball players
Cocodrilos de Caracas players
Dinamo Sassari players
Mens Sana Basket players
Nevada Wolf Pack men's basketball players
Shooting guards
Small forwards
Basketball players from Seattle
Virtus Bologna players
American men's basketball players
21st-century African-American sportspeople
20th-century African-American people